The following is a list of famous people born in Northland, New Zealand, and people who spent significant periods of their lives living in the Northland region.

Media
 Laurence Clark, cartoonist

Political
 Ria Bond, politician (New Zealand First)
 Te Paea Cherrington, tribal leader
 Hōne Heke, chief and war leader
 Hongi Hika, chief and war leader
 Jack Marshall, former Prime Minister
 Matt McCarten, political organiser
 Winston Peters, politician, deputy Prime Minister (New Zealand First)
Kelvin Davis (politician), Deputy Leader of the Labour Party.
 Rawiri Taiwhanga, tribal leader
John Carter politician (National Party).
Te Ruki Kawiti, chief and war leader.

Art

Entertainment
 Billy T. James, comedian
 Maewa Kaihau, composer
 Anika Moa, musician
 Rena Owen, actress
 Rawiri Paratene, actor
 Keith Urban, singer

Military
 Willie Apiata, Victoria Cross recipient
 Fred Baker, soldier

Sports
 Con Barrell
 Bryce Beeston
 Selwyn Blackmore
 Craig Blackwood
 Adam Blair, rugby league
 Noel Bowden
 Richard Brazendale
 Laurie Byers
 Randall Carrington
 Ellis Child
 Murray Child
 Jeremy Christie
 Barry Cooper, cricket
 Catherine Cox
 Bob Cunis
 Mike Davidson
 Eric Dunn
 Samuel Ellis, cricket
 Abby Erceg, football
 Ken Going, rugby union
 Sid Going, rugby union
 Billy Guyton, rugby union
 David Holwell, rugby union
 Ian Jones, rugby union
 Suzie Muirhead, field hockey
 Rene Ranger, rugby union
 Tim Southee, cricket
 Blair Tuke, sailor

Business
 Michael Hill, jeweller
 Ngāwini Yates, storekeeper, farmer and businesswoman

Academics
 Mick Brown, judge
 Annabella Mary Geddes, welfare worker and community leader
 'Tākou' Himiona Tūpākihi Kāmira, Māori tohunga, historian and genealogist

Others
 John Samuel Edmonds, one of the first settlers who emigrated with his family from Dorset, England after New Zealand was established.

References

Northland